Hurcott Farm is a 26.3 hectare geological Site of Special Scientific Interest in Somerset, notified in 1993.

At this site heavily cemented Pleistocene terrace gravels of the River Cary have yielded an abundant freshwater and terrestrial molluscan fauna. The fauna has an interglacial aspect, and includes Corbicula fluminalis and Pisidium clessini. This site is of critical importance as the keystone of the Pleistocene stratigraphy of southern Somerset, and as a freshwater facies-equivalent of the Burtle Beds.

Sources

 English Nature citation sheet for the site (accessed 10 August 2006)

External links
 English Nature website (SSSI information)

Sites of Special Scientific Interest in Somerset
Sites of Special Scientific Interest notified in 1993
Geology of Somerset